The Court of Historic American Flags is a collection of flagpoles and metal plaques in Los Angeles' Grand Park, in the U.S. state of California.

Description and history 

The court's construction was funded by the County of Los Angeles Board of Supervisors and the Los Angeles County Council of the Veterans of Foreign Wars in the 1960s. It was created in 1971.

The following flags are displayed:

 Taunton “Liberty and Union” Flag
 Bunker Hill Battle Flag
 Liberty Tree Flag
 Moultrie Flag (Liberty Flag)
 Pine Tree “An Appeal to Heaven” Flag
 Gadsen flag
 Grand Union Flag
 Betsy Ross flag
 Bennington flag
 Star-Spangled Banner
 Lake Erie Flag (Don’t Give Up the Ship)
 Old Glory
 Lone Star Flag of Texas
 California Bear Republic Flag
 Fort Sumter Flag
 48-Star Flag
 50-Star American Flag (Official Flag)
 POW/MIA Flag

References

External links

 

Civic Center, Los Angeles
Flags of the United States